Boguchansky (masculine), Boguchanskaya (feminine), or Boguchanskoye (neuter) may refer to:
Boguchansky District, a district of Krasnoyarsk Krai, Russia
Boguchany (Boguchanskaya) Dam, a power station in Russia